Luca Cattaneo (born 30 January 1989) is an Italian footballer. He plays as a midfielder for Cjarlins Muzane.

Club career
He made his Serie C debut for Savona on 1 September 2013 in a game against AlbinoLeffe.

On 31 January 2019, he joined Gubbio on loan.

On 11 July 2019, he signed a 2-year contract with Piacenza. 

On 11 February 2021 he moved to Vibonese. After one and a half year at Vibonese, Cattaneo moved to fellow league club A.S.D. Cjarlins Muzane in July 2022.

References

External links
 

Living people
1989 births
Sportspeople from the Province of Como
Footballers from Lombardy
Association football midfielders
Italian footballers
F.C. Pavia players
Savona F.B.C. players
Bassano Virtus 55 S.T. players
Pordenone Calcio players
Brescia Calcio players
A.C. Reggiana 1919 players
Novara F.C. players
A.S. Gubbio 1910 players
Piacenza Calcio 1919 players
U.S. Vibonese Calcio players
A.S.D. Cjarlins Muzane players
Serie B players
Serie C players
Serie D players